The Diocese of Massa Lubrense was a Roman Catholic diocese in Italy, located in Massa Lubrense, Naples in the ecclesiastical province of Sorrento.

History
1024: Established as Diocese of Massa Lubrense (Dioecesis Massalubrensis)
27 Jun 1818: Suppressed (to Archdiocese of Sorrento)
1968: Restored as  Titular Episcopal See of Massa Lubrense (Massalubrensis)

Ordinaries

Diocese of Massa Lubrense
Erected: 1024
Latin Name: Massalubrensis

Jacopo Scannapecora (15 Jan 1466 – 1506 Died)
Gerolamo Castaldi (5 Jul 1506 – 1521 Died)
Pietro de' Marchesi (12 Apr 1521 – 1544 Died)
Gerolamo Borgia (1544 – 1550 Died)
Giambatista Borgia (18 Mar 1545 – 1560 Died)
Andrea Belloni (27 Jun 1560 – 1577 Died)
Giuseppe Faraoni (9 Mar 1577 – 26 Nov 1581 Appointed, Bishop of Crotone)
Giambattista Palma (1581 – 1594 Died)
Lorenzo Asprella (19 Dec 1594 – 1605 Died)
Agostino Quinzio, O.P. (17 Aug 1605 – 1611 Died)
Ettore Gironda (24 Jan 1611 – 1626 Died)
Maurizio Centini, O.F.M. Conv. (9 Feb 1626 – 12 May 1631 Appointed, Bishop of Mileto)
Alessandro Gallo (24 Nov 1632 – 4 Mar 1645 Died)
Gian Vincenzo de' Giuli (15 May 1645 – 19 Jan 1672 Died)
Francesco Maria Neri (16 May 1672 – 10 Jan 1678 Appointed, Bishop of Venosa)
Andrea Massarenghi (28 Mar 1678 – 29 Sep 1684 Died)
Giovanni Battista Nepita (26 Mar 1685 – 12 Jul 1701 Died)
Jacopo Maria Rossi (23 Jan 1702 – Jan 1738 Died)
Giovanni Andrea Schiano (22 Jul 1738 – 12 Dec 1745 Died)
Liborio Pisani (9 Mar 1746 – Jul 1756 Died)
Giuseppe Bellotti (3 Jan 1757 – 11 May 1788 Died)
Angelo Maria Vassalli, O.S.B. (18 Jun 1792 – 1797 Died)

See also
Catholic Church in Italy

References

Former Roman Catholic dioceses in Italy